Pilot Mountain is a mountain in the Bow River valley of Banff National Park in Alberta, Canada. It is located southeast of Redearth Creek and directly west of the Trans-Canada Highway.

The mountain was named in 1884 by George M. Dawson, for its location is where the Bow Valley changes direction, thus affording distant views of the mountain all along the valley.

Pilot Mountain can be scrambled on the northwest face by someone with good routefinding skills. Nearby Mount Brett can be ascended from a ridge off the western slopes of Pilot Mountain.

Geology
Like other mountains in Banff Park, Pilot Mountain is composed of sedimentary rock laid down from the Precambrian to Jurassic periods. Formed in shallow seas, this sedimentary rock was pushed east and over the top of younger rock during the Laramide orogeny.

Climate 
Based on the Köppen climate classification, Pilot Mountain is located in a subarctic climate with cold, snowy winters, and mild summers.

References

Further reading

External links 
 Pilot Mountain weather: Mountain Forecast
 Parks Canada web site: Banff National Park
 Pilot Mountain Route Beta - Dow Williams

Two-thousanders of Alberta
Mountains of Banff National Park
Canadian Rockies